The 1966–67 daytime network television schedule for the three major English-language commercial broadcast networks in the United States covers the weekday and weekend daytime hours from September 1966 to August 1967.

Talk shows are highlighted in  yellow, local programming is white, reruns of older programming are orange, game shows are pink, soap operas are chartreuse, news programs are gold, children's programs are light purple and sports programs are light blue. New series are highlighted in bold.

Note: This is the first full season in which practically all NBC weekday programs were in color.

Monday-Friday

With the final daytime airing of Where The Action Is on March 31, 1967, ABC returned the 4:30 (ET)/3:30 (CT) timeslot to its affiliates, joining CBS and NBC in ending its daytime lineup after the aforementioned timeslot.

Saturday

Sunday

By network

ABC

Returning series:
ABC News
Ben Casey 
Beany and Cecil
The Bugs Bunny Show
The Bullwinkle Show 
Dateline:Hollywood
Dark Shadows
The Dating Game
Discovery 1966-1967
The Nurses (from CBS)
The Donna Reed Show 
Father Knows Best 
General Hospital
Issues and Answers
Let's Make a Deal
Linus the Lionhearted (from CBS)
The Magilla Gorilla Show
The Milton the Monster Show
The New American Bandstand 1967
The Beatles 
The New Casper Cartoon Show
The Newlywed Game
News with the Woman's Touch
Peter Jennings with the News
The Peter Potamus Show 
The Porky Pig Show 
Supermarket Sweep
Tennessee Tuxedo and His Tales  (from CBS)
Where the Action Is

New series:
Dream Girl of  '67
The Children's Doctor
Everybody's Talking
The Family Game
The Fugitive 
The Honeymoon Race
The King Kong Show
One in a Million

Not returning from 1965–66
A Time for Us
Arlene Dahl's Beauty Spot
It's Confidential For Women
Never Too Young
The Young Marrieds
The Young Set
Shenanigans

CBS

Returning series:
Andy of Mayberry 
Art Linkletter's House Party
As the World Turns
Camera Three
Captain Kangaroo
CBS Evening News
CBS Morning News with Mike Wallace
CBS News
The Dick Van Dyke Show 
The Edge of Night
Face the Nation
The Guiding Light
Lamp Unto My Feet
The Linkletter Show
Look Up and Live
Love of Life
Mighty Mouse & The Mighty Heroes
The NFL Today
Password
Search for Tomorrow
The Secret Storm
Sunrise Semester
Ted Mack's Amateur Hour
To Tell the Truth
Tom and Jerry
Underdog (moved from NBC)
Where the Heart Is

New series:
The Beagles
The Beverly Hillbillies 
Candid Camera 
Frankenstein Jr. and The Impossibles
The Lone Ranger
The New Adventures of Superman
The Road Runner Show
Space Ghost and Dino Boy

Not returning from 1965-66
I Love Lucy 
The Real McCoys 
The Heckle and Jeckle Cartoon Show
Tennessee Tuxedo and His Tales (moved to ABC)
Linus the Lionhearted (moved to ABC)
The Quick Draw McGraw Show 
Sky King 
Lassie 
My Friend Flicka 
The CBS Saturday News

NBC

Returning series:
Another World
Another World in Bay City
The Atom Ant/Secret Squirrel Show
Astro Boy 
The Bell Telephone Hour / Actuality Specials (continues into Primetime)
Concentration
Cool McCool
Days of Our Lives
The Doctors
Eye Guess
The Flintstones 
The Frank McGee Report
Frontiers of Faith
Hidden Faces
Jeopardy!
Let's Make a Deal
The Match Game
Meet the Press
NBC News
NBC Saturday Night News
NBC Sunday Night News
Today
Top Cat 
You Don't Say!
Young Samson

New series:
Animal Secrets
The Hollywood Squares
Kimba The White Lion
Personality
Reach for the Stars
The Smithsonian
Snap Judgment
The Space Kidettes
The Super 6

Not returning from 1965-66
Chain Letter
Fractured Phrases
Let's Play Post Office
Morning Star
Paradise Bay
Showdown
Swinging Country
Underdog (Moved to CBS)
Fury 
The First Look
Exploring

See also
1966-67 United States network television schedule (prime-time)
1966-67 United States network television schedule (late night)

Sources
Castleman & Podrazik, The TV Schedule Book, McGraw-Hill Paperbacks, 1984
TV schedules, NEW YORK TIMES, September 1966-September 1967 (microfilm)

United States weekday network television schedules
1966 in American television
1967 in American television